Antonis Fotiadis (born 1899, date of death unknown) was a Greek football player who played for the clubs Apollon in Smyrna, and later for Panionios in Athens, following the Greco-Turkish war between 1919 and 1922. He played for the national team in the 1920 Olympic Games in Antwerp.

References

External links

1899 births
Year of death unknown
Greek footballers
Footballers at the 1920 Summer Olympics
Olympic footballers of Greece
Association football goalkeepers
Emigrants from the Ottoman Empire to Greece
Footballers from İzmir
Smyrniote Greeks